Giovanni Biliverti (surname also written as Bilivelt and Bilivert or other variants) (Florence, 25 August 1585 – Florence, 16 July 1644) was an Italian painter of the late-Mannerism and early-Baroque period, active mainly in his adoptive city of Florence, as well as Rome.

Life and work
Biliverti was born as Jan Bilevelt. His father was Giacomo Giovanni Biliverti (born as Jacob Janszoon Bijlevelt) (1550–1603), goldsmith and hard-stone carver working for the Medici. After his father’s death in 1603, Giovanni worked in the studio of Lodovico Cigoli, following him in April 1604 till 1607 to Rome. There he worked in projects approved by Pope Clement VIII.

In 1609 Bilivert joined the Medici-sponsored guild of artists, the Accademia del Disegno in Florence. Bilivert was employed by Cosimo II de' Medici from 1611 until 1621, as a designer for works in pietra dura. His Grateful Tobias and Chastity of Joseph (c. 1618) are found in the Galleria Palatina of the Palazzo Pitti. Late in life, he became blind  Among his pupils were Cecco Bravo, Agostino Melissi, Baccio del Bianco, and Orazio Fidani. He painted a Hagar in the Desert once in the Hermitage and a Christ and the Samaritan Woman once in the Belvedere in Vienna.

References

Artnet biography.
 Short biography.

1585 births
1644 deaths
16th-century Italian painters
Italian male painters
17th-century Italian painters
Italian Baroque painters
Italian Mannerist painters
Painters from Florence